This is a list of building or structure fires where a building or structure has caught fire. For major urban conflagrations, see List of town and city fires.



Antiquity through Middle Ages
 586 BCFirst Temple in Jerusalem burned by Nebuchadnezzar, king of the Babylonians.
 480 BCAcropolis of Athens burnt during the second Persian invasion of Greece.
 356 BCTemple of Artemis at Ephesus, arson by Herostratus.
 70 ADSecond Temple in Jerusalem burned by Roman Empire troops under general Titus.
 Library of Alexandria destroyed by fire. Evidence is scant for all four fires, but the library was eventually destroyed.
 48 BCLibrary of Alexandria accidentally burned during siege by Julius Caesar.
 272Library of Alexandria possibly burned during the occupation of Alexandria.
 391Library of Alexandria possibly burned by order of Roman Emperor Theodosius I.
 642later sources attribute burning to Caliph Omar during the Muslim conquest of Egypt.
 1046Fire at St. Mary's Cathedral, Hildesheim, Germany.
 1184Lightning causes a fire at McDermott's Castle, Ireland, with 120–140 deaths.
 1190Fire at Clifford's Tower, York, England, killed at least 150 Jews.

16th century
 1577Fire in the Doge's Palace, Venice, destroyed major works by Bellini, Titian and Tintoretto.

17th century
 1613Globe Theatre in London. During the performance, cannon misfire caught the thatched roof on fire and the Theatre burned down.
 1652Town hall of Amsterdam burnt down. Treasures and important historical charters were destroyed.
 1671Much of the monastery of the Escorial outside Madrid burned in a fire lasting 15 days, destroying large numbers of artworks, books and manuscripts.
 1697The medieval "Tre Kronor" Royal Castle in Stockholm burned down and was eventually replaced by the present palace.
 1698The Tudor and Stuart Palace of Whitehall, London burned, except for Inigo Jones's Banqueting House. The ruins were demolished.

18th century
 1727Fire during puppet show in barn at Burwell, Cambridgeshire, England, killed 78 (including 51 children).
 1731, Brussels, destroyed and never rebuilt.
 1734The Royal Palace of the Alcazar, Madrid, burned on Christmas Eve. Eventually replaced by the present royal palace.
 1772Hôtel-Dieu de Paris fire in Paris, France.
 1794Christiansborg Palace, Copenhagen.

19th century
 1808Basilica of the Holy Sepulchre, Jerusalem. The fire caused the dome of the Rotunda to collapse, smashing the Edicule's exterior decoration.
 1808First Royal Opera House fire in London, England.
 1809St. James's Palace, London. Much of the south and east portions of the palace were destroyed and not rebuilt.
 1810Austrian embassy fire (fr), Paris. Officially 1 dead, in reality at least 91. 
 1811Richmond Theatre fire, Richmond, Virginia. 72 dead.
 1814The White House and United States Capitol in Washington, D.C. burned by the British.
 1822Grue Church fire, Norway, 113–117 dead.
 1823Basilica of Saint Paul Outside the Walls, Rome.

 1834Burning of Parliament at the Palace of Westminster, home to Parliament of the United Kingdom.
 1836First U.S. Patent Office fire in Blodget's Hotel.
 1836Fire at Chartres Cathedral destroyed the sweet chestnut "forest" above the vaults.
 1837The Winter Palace, St. Petersburg, Russia destroyed except for The Hermitage.
 1844Separate fires at St. Michael's & St. Augustine's Roman Catholic Churches during the Philadelphia Nativist riot, Philadelphia, Pennsylvania.
 1845Theatre fire in Canton, China. 1,670 killed.
 1863Church of the Company Fire in Santiago, Chile; killed over 2,500.
 1864Boijmans Museum, Rotterdam, destroyed 198 Dutch Old Master paintings.
 1856Second Royal Opera House fire in London, England.
 1870Château de Saint-Cloud destroyed by fire, October 13, 1870.
 1870Wickford Bank Fire, Rhode Island, destroyed 160 years of town records kept in bank vault (records for what are multiple towns today such as Narragansett, North Kingstown, etc.).
 1874Olympic Theatre destroyed by fire, killing two firefighters. Suspected arson.
 1875Precious Blood Church fire in Holyoke, Massachusetts, burned and killed 78.
 1876Brooklyn Theater fire, Brooklyn, New York, killed 273–300.
 1877Second U.S. Patent Office fire, in Washington, D.C.
 1881Ringtheater fire, Vienna, Austria, killed at least 384.
 1883Newhall House Hotel Fire, Milwaukee, Wisconsin, January 10, killed at least 70.
 1884Christiansborg Palace, Copenhagen.
 1887Paris Opéra Fire on 25 May, killed 200.
 1887Theatre Royal, Exeter fire, England on September 5, killed 186.
 1893World's Columbian Exposition cold storage warehouse fire in Chicago, Illinois on July 10, killed 18.
 1894Christmas Eve fire in Silver Lake, Oregon, on December 24, killed 43 people including 19 women and children.
 1895The Rotunda, University of Virginia, in Charlottesville, Virginia.
 1897Fire at the Bazar de la Charité, Paris on 4 May, killed 126, mostly women.
 1897Cold storage fire on fairgrounds in Chicago, Illinois, on July 10, killed 17 firefighters.
 1899Windsor Hotel East 47th Street/5th Avenue Manhattan, New York—at least 33 and 45 people killed (estimates vary)

20th century

1900s
 1900Hoboken Docks fire, New Jersey, on June 30, killed 326.
 1903Colney Hatch Lunatic Asylum fire, London, on January 27, killed 51.
 1903Iroquois Theater fire, Chicago, on December 30, at least 600 died.
 1904January fire in the Turin National University Library, Italy, resulted in serious damage to the Manuscripts Department.
 1904Great Fire of Toronto, April 19 fire that destroyed a large section of Downtown Toronto, Canada.
 1905Watson Street Lodging House fire in Glasgow , on November 19, killed 39.
 1908Rhoads Opera House fire, Boyertown, Pennsylvania, killed 170.
 1908Parker Building, New York City, January 10.
 1908Collinwood school fire, in Collinwood, Ohio (soon absorbed by Cleveland), on March 4, killed 175.
 1909Flores Theater fire, Acapulco, Guerrero, Mexico, on February 15, killed 250.

1910s

1910
 March 25L. Fish Furniture Company fire in Chicago, Illinois, killed 12.
 March 27Ököritófülpös, Hungary, fire in a barn during a dancing party killed 312 people.
 December 21–22Friedlander Leather Remnants factory fire, Philadelphia, Pennsylvania. 13 firemen and one policeman lost their lives in two separate collapses.
 December 22Nelson-Morris & Company stockyards fire in Chicago, Illinois, killed 21 firefighters.

1911
 March 25Triangle Shirtwaist Factory fire, New York City, killed 146.

1912
 January 9Equitable Life Assurance Building, New York City.
 November 29University of Maryland, College Park, majority of campus buildings destroyed.

1913
 February 28Dewey Hotel fire in Omaha, Nebraska, killed 20.
 July 22Binghamton Factory fire, New York, killed 31.

1914
 March 9Missouri Athletic Club fire in St. Louis, Missouri, killed 30.

1915
 October 28St. John's School fire, Peabody, Massachusetts.

1916
 February 3Centre Block of the Parliament Buildings in Ottawa, the capital of Canada.

1918
 February 26Happy Valley Racecourse fire, Happy Valley, Hong Kong, over 600 killed.
 April 13Norman State Hospital fire in Norman, Oklahoma killed 40.

1919
 June 19Mayagüez Theater fire, San Juan, Puerto Rico, killed 150.

1920s

1921
 January 31Palace-Colonial Hotel fire in Hoboken, New Jersey, killed 10.

1922
 1922Public Records Office fire during civil unrest at the Four Courts complex, Dublin, Ireland, destroyed much of seven centuries of official Irish public records.

1923
 February 18Manhattan State Hospital fire in New York City, killed 25.
 17 MayCleveland School fire, Camden, South Carolina, killed 77.
 31 MayPetrograd Opera House fire in St. Petersburg, Russia, killed scores.

1924
 December 24Babbs Switch Schoolhouse fire, Oklahoma, killed 36.

1925
 March 18Madame Tussauds wax museum in London.

1926
 January 23Lafayette Hotel fire in Allentown, Pennsylvania, killed 13.
 July 14Twilight Inn hotel fire in Tannersville, New York, killed 22.
 September 5Dromcolliher cinema fire in County Limerick, Ireland, killed 48.

1927
 January 9Laurier Palace Theatre Fire, Montreal, killed 77 children.

1928
 September 22Teatro de Novedades theater fire killed 68 or maybe 110, in Madrid, Spain.
 October 8Penitentiary fire in Junction City, Ohio, killed 17.

1929
 15 MayCleveland Clinic fire, Cleveland, Ohio, killed 125.
 July 11Gillingham Fair fire disaster, Kent, England, killed 15 when firefighting demonstration went wrong.
 September 20Study Club nightclub fire, Detroit, Michigan, killed 22.
 December 31Glen Cinema disaster, Paisley, Scotland, killed 71.

1930s

1930
 March 10Jinhae Primary School fire, Jinhae, Gyeongsangnamdo, South Korea, killed 104.
 April 181930 Costești wooden church fire in Argeș County, Romania, killed 118.
 April 21Ohio Penitentiary fire, Columbus, Ohio, killed 322.

1931
 March 7Prison camp fire in Kenansville, North Carolina, killed 11 convicts.
 July 6Glaspalast, Munich, fire.
 July 25Fire at the Little Sisters of the Poor's Home for the Aged in Pittsburgh, Pennsylvania, killed 42 and injured more than 200.

1932
 December 26Shirokiya Department Store fire in Tokyo, Japan, 14 killed.

1933

 February 27Reichstag fire in Berlin, caused by arson, used to justify expansion of Nazi rule.

1934
 March 21The Great Hakodate Fire killed at least 2,166 people in southern Hokkaido, Japan.
 March 24Federal Transient Bureau building fire in Lynchburg, Virginia, killed 22.
 November 101934 Wimpole Street fire in Wimpole Street, London; killed 5 women.
 December 11Kerns Hotel fire in Lansing, Michigan, killed 34, including seven Michigan legislators.

1935
 August 22Berlin Fair Fire also damaged the Berlin Radio Tower.

1936

 November 30The Crystal Palace housed the 1851 Great Exhibition in London; destroyed.

1937
 February 13Antoung Movie Theater fire, China, killed 658.
 April 20Kilingi-Nõmme school fire in Estonia, killed 18 schoolchildren.
 July 91937 Fox vault fire, Little Ferry, New Jersey, burned and destroyed almost all of studio's pre-1932 silent films.
 September 7Witley Court in Worcestershire, England, burned down.
 September 17Rotunde, a landmark of the 1873 Vienna World's Fair, totally destroyed. 
 December 20South Tomita Primary School fire, Shirahama, Wakayama, Japan, killed 81.

1938
 January 18College of the Sacred Heart fire in St. Hyacinthe, Quebec, killed 46.
 May 16Terminal Hotel Fire in Atlanta, Georgia, killed 35.
 October 28Nouvelles Galeries department store fire, Marseille, France, killed 73.

1939
 March 2Queen Hotel fire in Halifax, Nova Scotia, killed 28.

1940s

1940
 January 4Marlborough Hotel fire in Minneapolis, Minnesota, killed 20.
 April 23Rhythm Club fire, Natchez, Mississippi, killed 209.
 October 8Mission school dormitory fire in Little, Kentucky, killed 10, including nine female students.

1941
 October 31Booth's clothing factory fire in Huddersfield, England, killed 49.
 December 12Knights of Columbus Hostel fire in St. John's, Newfoundland and Labrador, killed 99.

1942
 November 28Cocoanut Grove fire in Boston, Massachusetts, killed 492.
 December 8Seacliff Lunatic Asylum fire, Seacliff, New Zealand, killed 37 female patients.

1943
 February 1Lake Forest Park Sanitarium fire in Seattle, Washington, killed 32.
 February 23Cavan Orphanage fire, Ireland, killed 36.
 March 6Hoteiza Theater Fire in Kucchan, Hokkaidō, Japan, killed 205.
 May 10Biblioteca Nacional in Lima, Peru. In May, a fire completely destroyed the National Library, with the loss of 100,000 volumes as well as 40,000 manuscripts.
 September 7Gulf Hotel fire in Houston, Texas, killed 55.

1944
 May 12Union Hotel fire in Oroville, California, killed 15.
 July 6Hartford Circus fire in Hartford, Connecticut, killed 168.

1945
 January 16General Clark Hotel fire in Chicago, Illinois, killed 14.
 January 31Boarding home/nursery fire in Auburn, Maine, killed 17, including 16 babies.
 April 12The St. Stephen's Cathedral in Vienna, Austria, suffered a devastating fire.
 MayOld Town Hall in Prague, Czechoslovakia. In May, during the Prague uprising, a fire severely damaged the Old Town Hall, with the loss of its bell, the oldest in Bohemia, and 70,000 volumes, as well as historically priceless manuscripts.
 July 28B-25 Empire State Building crash. The Empire State Building in New York City is set on fire by a B-25 Mitchell bomber that crashed into the building, killing 14.
 December 24Niles Street Convalescent Hospital fire in Hartford, Connecticut, killed 21.

1946
 January 28Tinker Air Force Base in Oklahoma City, Oklahoma, hangar fire, killed 10.
 June 5LaSalle Hotel Fire in Chicago killed 61.
 June 19Hotel Canfield fire in Dubuque, Iowa, killed 19.
 December 7Winecoff Hotel fire in Atlanta, Georgia, killed 119.

1947
 February 8Karlslust dance hall fire in Berlin, killed 80–88.
 August 30Le Select Cinema fire in Rueil-Malmaison, France, killed 87.
 November 18Ballantyne's department store fire, Christchurch, New Zealand, killed 41.

1948
 March 10Fire at Highland Hospital in Asheville, North Carolina, killed nine, including Zelda Fitzgerald.
 September 22, Hong Kong, 176 killed and 69 injured.

1949
 April 5St. Anthony's Hospital fire in Effingham, Illinois, killed 70 .

1950s

1950
 January 7Mercy Hospital fire, Davenport, Iowa, killed 41.
 March 18Sandia Base stockade fire in Albuquerque, New Mexico, killed 14.
 July 2Kinkaku-ji fire by arsonist in Kyoto, Japan.
 December 22Convalescent home fire in Amarillo, Texas, killed 10.

1951
 January 30Convalescent home fire in Hoquiam, Washington, killed 21.
 May 13al-Duniya Theater fire in Kano, present day of Nigeria, killed 100.
 May 19Ohara Movie Theater fire in Hamanaka, Hokkaido, killed 40.

1952
 September 23Coleshill House in Berkshire, England, totally destroyed.
 October 31Nursing home fire in Hillsboro, Missouri, killed 20.

1953
 March 29Littlefield Nursing Home fire in Largo, Florida, killed 32.
 April 17Haber Screw Company building fire in Chicago, Illinois, killed 32.

1954
 March 31Cleveland Hill School fire in Cheektowaga, New York, killed 15.

1955
 February 12Barton Hotel fire in Chicago, Illinois, killed 29.
 February 16Elderly home for Catholic church fire in Yokohama, Japan, killed 100.
 April 28Green Mill Hotel fire in Chicago, Illinois, killed 12.
 May 11Cinema fire in Wielopole Skrzyńskie, Poland, killed 58 and injured 20.

1956
 January 29Arundel Park Auditorium fire in Anne Arundel County, Maryland, killed 10.
 July 29McKee refinery fire killed 19 firefighters.
 July 31Reagan Nursing Home fire in Puxico, Missouri, killed 12.

1957
 February 13Nursing home fire in Council Bluffs, Iowa, killed 16.
 February 17Warrenton Nursing Home fire in Warrenton, Missouri, killed 72.
 November 16Moonglow Hotel fire in Niagara Falls, New York, killed 18.

1958
 March 19Monarch Underwear Company fire in New York City, killed 24.
 December 1Our Lady of the Angels School fire, Chicago, killed 95.
 December 16Almacen Vida Department Store Fire, killed 83 and injured 200 in Bogotá, Colombia.

1959
 March 5Arkansas Negro Boys' Industrial School fire in Wrightsville, Arkansas, killed 21.
 June 23Stalheim Hotel fire, Norway, killed 34.

1960s

1960
 March 2Kukje Rubber Manufacturing plant 2 fire at Busan, South Korea, killed 68, injured 44.
 March 28Cheapside Street whisky bond fire, Glasgow, Scotland, killed 19 firefighters.
 July 14Guatemala Mental Hospital Fire, killed 225.
 November 13Syrian Movie Theater Fire in Amuda (Syria), killed 152 schoolchildren.

1961
 January 6Thomas Hotel fire in San Francisco, California, killed 20.
 May 1The Penthouse Club, formerly the Top Storey nightclub fire in Bolton, England killed 19.
 November 51961 Elbarusovo school fire, Soviet Union, killed 109.
 December 8Hartford Hospital fire in Hartford, Connecticut, killed 16.
 December 17Niterói circus fire in Niterói (Brazil) killed 503.

1962
 August 2, in New Kowloon, Hong Kong, killed 44 and injured 21.
 November 9The Ford Rotunda in Dearborn, Michigan was destroyed by fire during preparations for a Christmas display.

1963
 May 4Le Monde Theater fire at Diourbel, Kaolack, Senegal on, killing 64.
 October 31Fairgrounds Coliseum explosion in Indianapolis, Indiana killed 74.
 November 18Surfside Hotel Fire in Atlantic City, New Jersey, killing 25.
 November 23Golden Age Nursing Home fire in Fitchville, Ohio killed 63.
 December 29Hotel Roosevelt fire in Jacksonville, Florida, killing 22.

1964
 May 23All Hallows Church parish hall fire in San Francisco, California, killed 17.
 December 18McGraw Nursing Home fire in Fountaintown, Indiana, killed 20.

1965
 December 11Seeley Club fire in Chicago, Illinois, killed 13. Robert Lee Lassiter was found guilty of murder for setting the fire.
 December 21Yonkers Jewish Community Center fire in Yonkers, New York, killed 12.

1966
 January 28Paramount Hotel fire in Boston, Massachusetts, killed 11.
 August 13William Booth Memorial Home fire in Australia, killed 30.

1967
 February 7Dale's Penthouse restaurant fire in Montgomery, Alabama, killed 25.
 March 6Mélan orphanage in Taninges, France, killed 18.
 May 22L'Innovation Department Store fire, in Brussels killed 251 and injured 62.
 July 16Florida State Prison Fire, in Jay, Florida killed 37.
 December 24Store fire "Regalux" in Formosa, Argentina killing 20 and injuring 70.

1968
 February 7Mickelberry Sausage Company plant explosion and building fire in Chicago, Illinois, killed nine.
 February 26Shelton Hospital fire, Shrewsbury, killing 21 and injures 14.
 November 2 at Arima Spa, Kobe, Hyogo, Japan, killing 30 and injuring 44.
 November 18Stern's upholstery factory fire in Glasgow, Scotland, killed 24.

1969
 February 5Bandai Atami International Sightseeing Hotel fire, in Koriyama, Japan, killed 31.
 December 27Rose and Crown Hotel fire in Saffron Walden, England, killed 11.

1970s

1970
 January 9Nursing home fire in Marietta, Ohio, killed 32.
 March 20Ozark Hotel arson fire in Seattle, Washington, killed 21.
 May 23Britannia Bridge fire in the Menai Strait in Wales; no casualties, but destroyed the link between island of Anglesey and the Wales mainland.
 August 31Fenglei ship fire in Shanghai, China, killed 15 and severely injured 60.
 November 1Club Cinq-Sept fire in Saint-Laurent-du-Pont, France, killed 146.
 December 20Pioneer Hotel fire, Tucson, Arizona, killed 29.

1971
 January 14Westminster Terrace Presbyterian Home for Senior Citizens fire in Louisville, Kentucky, killed 10.
 June 26–27Czechowice-Dziedzice Refinery fire, Czechowice-Dziedzice, Poland, 37 killed, 105 injured.
 September 28Hotel 't Silveren Seepaerd fire, Eindhoven, Netherlands, eleven killed, 16 severely injured.
 October 19Geiger Nursing Home fire in Honesdale, Pennsylvania, killed 15.
 October 30Under construction  in Aberdeen Harbour, Hong Kong, killed up to 34 workers.
 December 25Taeyunkak Hotel Fire in Seoul, South Korea killed 158 people.

1972
 January 26Green Nursing Home fire in Lincoln Heights, Ohio, killed 10.
 February 24Andraus Building Fire killed 16 in São Paulo.
 April 4Fair Hills boarding home fire in Rosecrans, Wisconsin, killed 10.
 May 5Carver Convalescent Center fire in Springfield, Illinois, killed 10.
 May 13Sennichi Department Store Building fire in Osaka, Japan, killed 118.
 June 17Hotel Vendome fire in Boston, killed nine firefighters.
 July 5Coldharbour Hospital fire in Sherborne, England, killed 30.
 August 18 Nursing Home in Ris-Orangis, France, killed 12.
 September 2Blue Bird Café fire in Montreal, firebombed, killed 37.
 September 24 A fire at the Oscar Club restaurant in Rhodes, Greece killed 31 and injured a further 16, mostly Scandinavian tourists.
 November 21Robinson Department Store fire, killed twelve and destroyed the 114-year-old landmark building in Singapore.
 December 2Seoul Citizen Hall (present day of Sejong Center) in Jongno-gu, Seoul,, killed 51 and injured 76.

1973
 January 29Street's Rest Home fire in Pleasantville, New Jersey, killed 10. Resident Harry Kemp was arrested for setting the fire.
 February 6Edouard-Pailleron school in Paris, France (arson), killed 20. 
 March 18Whiskey Au Go Go nightclub in Brisbane, Queensland was firebombed, killed 15.
 June 24UpStairs Lounge arson attack in the UpStairs Lounge, a gay bar, in New Orleans, Louisiana killed 32.
 July 12–16National Archives Fire in St. Louis, Missouri.
 August 2Summerland disaster in Douglas, Isle of Man killed 51.
 September 1Hotel Hafnia fire, Copenhagen, Denmark, 35 killed.
 November 291973 Taiyo Department Store fire in Kumamoto, Kyūshū, Japan, killed 104.
 December 4Caley Nursing Home and Rehabilitation Center fire in Wayne, Pennsylvania, killed 15.

1974
 January 23Sacred Heart School fire in Heusden, Belgium, killed 23.
 February 1Joelma Fire killed 188 in São Paulo.
 June 30Gulliver's nightclub fire killed 24 in Port Chester, New York as a result of arson at an adjacent business to cover up a minor burglary.
 November 3Daewan Corner complex building fire, Dongdaemun-gu, Seoul, South Korea, killed 88 and injured 35.
 December 12Worsley Hotel fire, Maida Vale, London, case of arson, resulting in attendance of over 25 appliances and killed 7.

1975
 January 22Marikina factory fire in Marikina, Philippines, killed 42 and injured 79.
 February 13The North Tower of the World Trade Centre in New York City caught fire on the 11th floor.
 June 9Seminole County jail fire in Sanford, Florida, killed 11.
 July 7Pomona Hotel fire in Portland, Oregon. Act of arson, killed 12.
 August 17Philadelphia Refinery Fire, Philadelphia, Pennsylvania, killed 8 firemen.

1976
 January 10Pathfinder Hotel fire in Fremont, Nebraska, killed 23.
 January 30Wincrest Nursing Home fire in Chicago, Illinois, killed 23.
 December 26Retirement Home fire, Goulds, Newfoundland and Labrador, killed 22.

1977

 February 1861st Regiment Farm fire in Xinjiang, China, killed 694. The fire started when a pile of undisposed wreaths for the late Mao Zedong were set off by a child celebrating the Chinese New Year.
 February 25Rossiya Hotel fire in Moscow, Russia, 42–45 killed and 50 injured.
 May 9Hotel Polen fire in Amsterdam, Netherlands, killed 33.
 May 28Beverly Hills Supper Club fire killed 165 and injured more than 200 in Southgate, Kentucky; third deadliest nightclub fire in U.S. history.
 December 10A fire at the Wenonah Hotel in Bay City, Michigan killed 10.
 December 13A fire in the Aquinas Hall dormitory at Providence College in Rhode Island killed 10 students.

1978
 August 19Cinema Rex fire, Abadan, Khuzestan, Iran (arson), killed between 377-470.
 March 14A prison fire in Buenos Aires, Argentina, killed 61 and injured 85.
 June 11A fire spread at the head office of the daily newspaper Le Mauricien in Port Louis, Mauritius and became the focus of the Affaire Sheik Hossen political scandal and enquiry.
 August 2Waldbaum's supermarket fire, Brooklyn, New York. Six New York City firefighters died in the line of duty when the roof collapsed, plunging 12 firefighters into the flames.
 November 5The Younkers Department store at the Merle Hay Mall in Des Moines, Iowa, killed 10 store employees. The store was closed and rebuilt a year after the fire.
 November 26Holiday Inn fire in Greece, New York. Act of arson, killed 10.

1979
 January 23Old People's Nurse Home fire at Virrat, Pirkanmaa, Finland, killed at least 26.
 April 2Nursing home fire in Farmington, Missouri, killed 26.
 May 8Woolworth store fire in Manchester, England, killed 11.
 June 9Luna Park Ghost Train fire, at Luna Park Sydney, in Australia, killed 7.
 July 12Hotel Corona de Aragón fire in Zaragoza, Aragon, Spain, killed at least 80.
 July 29Lakshimki Talkies cinema fire, in Tuticorin, Tamil Nadu, India, killed 73.
 September 28Hotel Am Augarten fire in Vienna, Austria, killed 25.
 November 11Pioneer, Ohio nursing home fire, killed 14.
 December 5Bar fire in Rosario, Argentina, killed 15 and injured 11.

1980s

1980
 January 1Opémiska Community Hall fire, Chapais, Quebec, Canada, killed 48.
 May 20A fire in the Eventide Home for the Aged in Kingston, Jamaica killed 157.
 July 14A fire on the third floor of the Extendicare Ltd. nursing home in Mississauga, Ontario, killed 21 residents.
 July 26Boarding home fire in Bradley Beach, New Jersey, killed 24.
 August 16Denmark Place fire fire by arson killed 37 in Soho, London.
 October 31-November 1Górna Grupa mental hospital fire, in Górna Grupa, Poland, during the night killing 55 patients and wounding 26.
 November 21MGM Grand Hotel and Casino fire in Las Vegas, Nevada, killed 87.
 November 22Kawaji Prince Hotel Fire in Kinugawa, Japan, killed 45.
 December 4Stouffer's Inn of Westchester in Harrison, NY, killed 26.

1981
 January 9Boarding home fire in Keansburg, New Jersey, killed 30.
 January 18New Cross Fire, London, killed 13.
 February 8Bangalore circus fire in Bangalore, India, killed 92.
 February 14Stardust Disaster, discotheque fire in Dublin killed 48.
 February 14Edifício Grande Avenida Fire in São Paulo, Brazil, killed 17.
 March 21The Santa María Tower fire in Santiago de Chile, killed 11.
 December 7Nilkanth Mahadev temple fire, Asarwa, Gujarat, India, killed 49.

1982
 February 8Hotel New Japan fire in downtown Tokyo, Japan, killed 33.
 March 6Westchase Hilton hotel fire in Houston, Texas, killed 12.
 April 25A fire resulting from an explosion at a antiques exhibition in Todi, Italy killed 34.
 May 11The Notre Dame de Lourdes Church fire in Fall River, Massachusetts destroyed historic church and much of two adjacent city blocks.
 November 25–26Minneapolis Thanksgiving Day Fire destroys the Northwestern National Bank building and former Donaldson's flagship store.
 December 23Dorothy Mae Apartments arson fire in Los Angeles killed 25 people, the highest death toll from a structure fire in the city's history.

1983
 February 13Cinema Statuto fire in Turin, Italy, killed 64.
 December 17Alcalá 20 nightclub fire in Madrid, Spain, killed 83.

1984
 May 11Haunted Castle attraction at Six Flags Great Adventure amusement park in Jackson Township, New Jersey. Eight teenagers lost their lives in a fast-moving fire. Their corpses were mistaken for mannequins by emergency personnel. None of them or the Six Flags administrators realized these fatalities until later.
 July 9York Minster fire. A fire destroyed part of the Minster's roof in York, England.
 July 23Union Oil refinery in Romeoville, IL had two explosions and a fire, killing at least 14 and injuring 23.

1985
 April 26Saavedra Psychiatric Hospital fire in Buenos Aires, Argentina, killed 79 and injured 247.
 May 11Valley Parade Ground Stadium fire in Bradford, England, killed 56.
 September 20The Tholsel, the town hall of Kilkenny, Ireland, is gutted by fire.

1986
 February 11 in Higashiizu, Shizuoka Prefecture, Japan, killed 24.
 March 31Hampton Court Palace fire near London, England, was determined to have been accidentally set by its only victim, the 86-year-old widow of General Richard Gale.
 April 26Chernobyl disaster an explostion and fire in the No. 4 reactor in the Chernobyl Nuclear Power Plant, leads to a meltdown resulting in the worst nuclear accident in history to date.
 November 1Fire and chemical spill at Sandoz in the Schweizerhalle industrial area near Basel, Switzerland, caused heavy pollution problems in the river Rhine.
 December 31Dupont Plaza Hotel fire, set by disgruntled employees, killed 97 in San Juan, Puerto Rico.

1987
 January 12The Kerr Mill fire destroyed three mills in Fall River, Massachusetts.
 July 7A fuel tanker truck ran into an ice cream parlour and exploded in Herborn, Germany; 12 houses set on fire and killed six.
 November 18King's Cross tube station fire in London killed 31 and injured 100.

1988
 May 4First Interstate Tower fire in Los Angeles, California. Fire breaks out, killing one.

1989
 February 8Premier Studio of Mysore fire, Mysore, Karnataka, India, killed 62.
 September 17Downunder Hostel fire, Australia, set by an arsonist in a backpackers hostel in Sydney, killed six.
 September 211989 Taufiqiah Al-Khairiah madrasa fire. Girls' school fire in Kedah, Malaysia, killed 27 girls.
 October 5Hillhaven Rehabilitation and Convalescent Home fire in Norfolk, Virginia, killed 12.
 December 24Sevier Center renovated hotel senior residence in Johnson City, Tennessee killed 14 by smoke inhalation.

1990s

1990
 January 14Flying discothèque fire at Zaragoza, Aragon, Spain, killed 43.
 March 25Happy Land fire, arson fire in the Bronx, New York City, killed 87, the deadliest crime committed by a single person in the history of New York City.

1991
 May 7Bright Sparklers Fireworks fire, killed 26 and injured over 100.
 September 3Hamlet chicken processing plant fire killed 25.
 December 17Funhouse at Blackpool Pleasure Beach, England, destroyed by fire.

1992

 February 3Shek Kong Vietnamese refugee detention centre fire, Hong Kong, killed 24 and injured 126.
 MayExecutive Council Building fire in Sarajevo, Bosnia and Herzegovina.
 September 16Pension de Vogel homeless hostel fire, The Hague, Netherlands, killed 11 and injured 15.
 November 20Windsor Castle fire, England.
 November 26A part of the roof and the upper floor of the Hofburg Imperial Palace in Vienna, Austria, burned down.

1993
 January 18Fire in a 10-story building in the Hsinhua section of Taipei, Taiwan, killed 34.
 February 14Linxi department store fire, Tangshan, Hebei, China, killed 79 and injured 51.
 March 16Paxton Hotel fire, Chicago, Illinois, killed 19.
 April 19During the Waco Siege a Branch Davidian church, Mount Carmel Center, was destroyed by fire near Waco, Texas, killed 76.
 May 10Kader Toy Factory fire, Bangkok, Thailand, killed 189.
 July 2Madimak Hotel fire, Sivas, Turkey, killed 35.
 November 20Zhili Toy Factory fire, Kuiyong, Shenzhen, Guangdong, China, killed 81.
 December 13Gaofu Textile Factory fire, Fuzhou, Fujian, China, killed 61.
 December 20Kheyvis nightclub fire in Buenos Aires, Argentina, killed 17 and injured 25.

1994
 January 10, Shek Kip Mei, Hong Kong, killed 12 in firebomb attack.
 February 4–5The Parlement of Brittany, set alight by fishermen on strike, is destroyed by fire.
 November 27Fuxin Discothèque fire at Fuxin, Liaoning, China, killed 234.
 December 101994 Karamay fire, Karamay, Xinjiang, China, killed 324 (288 pupils and 36 teachers).
 December 31Switel Hotel fire, Antwerp, Belgium, killed 15 and severely injured 164.

1995
 February 15Weierkang Club fire, Taichung, Taiwan, killed 64.
 March 14Anshan hotel fire, Anshan, Liaoning, China, killed 30.
 April 24Ürümqi fire, Urumqi, Xinjiang, China, killed 51.
 August 18Gyeonggi Women Technical School fire, Yongin, Gyeonggi, South Korea, killed 38.
 August 26Hotel St. George fire, Brooklyn, New York, United States.
 December 23Dabwali fire accident, Haryana, India, killed 540.

1996
 January 29Teatro La Fenice in Venice.
 March 18Ozone Disco fire, Quezon City, Philippines, killed 162 and injured 95.
 March 28Kebon Kembang shopping mall fire, Bogor, Jawa Barat, Indonesia, killed 78.
 April 11Düsseldorf Airport fire, killed 17.
 November 7Heaven Hill distillery fire in Kentucky.
 November 20The Garley Building fire, Hong Kong, killed 40.
 November 27Residential building fire caused by arson attack, Shanghai, China, killed 36.

1997
 January 25 caused by arson attack, Tsim Sha Tsui, Hong Kong, killed 17.
 February 11997 Aisin fire, Kariya, Aichi, Japan.
 June 8Brihadiswara temple fire started by a visitor's firecracker, at Thanjavur, Tamil Nadu, India, killed 60 and injured 200.
 June 13Uphaar Cinema fire, Green Park, New Delhi, India, killed 59.
 July 11Royal Jomtien Resort Hotel fire, in Thailand, killed 88.
 September 21Arson attack by an employee at a shoe factory, Jinjiang City, Fujian, China, killed 32.

1998
 March 25Dormitory fire at Bombolulu Girls High School, Mombasa, Kenya, killed 24.
 May 16Fire at the Lung Center of the Philippines in Quezon City killed 25.
 October 30Gothenburg nightclub fire in Gothenburg, Sweden, killed 63.
 December 3Orphanage fire in Manila, Philippines, killed 28.

1999
 February 15Lake Worth Church fire in Lake Worth, Texas killed three firefighters. Suspected arson.
 May 231999 L'Amicale riots in Port Louis, Mauritius killed 7 individuals linked to gambling house L'Amicale, following an arson attack associated with football hooliganism after a soccer match confronting Fire Brigade versus Scouts Club.
 June 30Sealand Youth Training Center Fire. The one-storey Sealand Youth Training Center fire at Hwaseong killed 23 and injured five.
 September 24Two-story buildings with cinema complex fire at Yogyakarta, Central Java, Indonesia, killed 75.
 October 30Four-story complex buildings with Sun-Hun Choe karaoke room fire at Incheon, South Korea, killed 54 and injured 70.
 December 3Worcester Cold Storage and Warehouse Co. fire killed six firefighters.
 December 26Jilin hotel fire, Changchun, Jilin, China, killed 20.

21st century

2000s

2000
 March 29Tiantang cinema fire in Jiaozuo, Henan, China, killed 74.
 April 22Qingzhou chicken processing plant fire, Qingzhou, Shandong, China, killed 38.
 May 13Enschede fireworks disaster in the Netherlands, killed 22.
 June 23Childers Palace Backpackers Hostel fire in Queensland, Australia, killed 15 in arson attack.
 June 30Fireworks factory fire, Guangdong, China, killed 36.
 August 27Fire in the Ostankino Tower in Moscow, Russia.
 December 25Luoyang Christmas fire in Henan, China, killed 309.

2001

 January 1Volendam New Years fire in the Netherlands killed 14 and injured 241.
 March 26Kyanguli Secondary school fire in Machakos, Eastern Province, Kenya, killed 68.
 May 1A fire at Phantasialand in Germany destroyed two roller coasters, a theatre and parts of the Westernstadt. It caused about 38 million Deutsche Mark (17 million USD) in damage and injured 54.
 August 6Erwadi fire incident in Tamil Nadu, India, killed 25.
 August 17Manor Hotel fire in Quezon City, Philippines, killed 75.
 September 1Myojo 56 building fire in Tokyo, Japan, killed 44 by arson.
 September 11September 11 attacks – Two airliners deliberately flown into the World Trade Center Twin Towers in New York City sparked fires on multiple floors. 2,606 victims died as a result of the fires and the subsequent collapse of the towers. A third building, World Trade Center Building 7, which was not hit by a plane, but heavily damaged due to the collapse of the towers, also caught fire and subsequently collapsed. A third plane crashed into the Pentagon in Washington, D.C. and its impact and subsequent fire killed 125 victims in the building.
 December 21Cathedral of St. John the Divine in New York City caught fire.
 December 29Mesa Redonda fire in Lima, killed 291.

2002
 June 26Shree Lee International footwear factory fire in Agra, Uttar Pradesh, India, killed 42.
 July 9Heppi Karaoke bar fire in Palembang, South Sumatra, Indonesia, killed 42.
 October 29Ho Chi Minh City ITC fire in Vietnam killed 60 and injured 90.
 November 2Sidi Moussa prison fire in El Jadida, Morocco, killed 50.
 December 1La Coajira nightclub fire in Caracas, Venezuela, killed 47.

2003
 January 2–3Château de Lunéville gutted by fire.
 February 18Daegu subway fire in South Korea, killed 192 by arson.
 February 20The Station nightclub fire in West Warwick, Rhode Island killed 100 and injured 230.
 February 26Greenwood Nursing Home fire in Hartford, Connecticut, killed 16.
 October 17Cook County Administration Building fire, killed 6; tied for largest litigated payout: $100 million dollars.
 September 25Nursing home fire in Nashville, Tennessee, killed 14.
 November 242003 Peoples' Friendship University of Russia fire in Moscow, Russia, killed 36.

2004
 February 16Zhongbai Commercial Plaza fire in Jilin, China, killed 53.
 May 17San Pedro Sula prison fire in Honduras, killed 103.
 May 24Momart warehouse fire in Leyton, East London destroyed numerous significant contemporary work of arts.
 July 162004 Kumbakonam School fire in Tamil-Nadu, India, killed 94.
 August 1Ycuá Bolaños supermarket fire in Asunción, Paraguay, killed 370 and injured 500.
 August 5The Bauges Riding school fire in Lescheraines, France, killed 10.
 December 30República Cromagnon nightclub fire in Buenos Aires, Argentina killed 194 and injured 714.

2005
 February 14–15Windsor Tower fire in Madrid, Spain, caused the building to partially collapse and injured seven.
 May 3-4 - Pizza Shop In Italy burns and speads quickly killed 6 and injured/burned 4
 September 5Beni Suef Cultural Palace fire in Egypt killed 46.
 October 27A fire at the detention center of Amsterdam Schiphol Airport killed 11 and injured 15.
 December 11–13Buncefield fire, a major explosion at Hertfordshire Oil Storage Terminal in Hemel Hempstead, England, injured 43.
 December 12Liaoyang City Central Hospital fire in Liaoyang, Jilin, China, killed 39.

2006
 February 24KTS Composite Textile factory fire in Chittagong, Bangladesh, killed 65 and injured 100.
 March 5Edificio Diego Portales (now Centro Cultural Gabriela Mistral) fire in Santiago, Chile, caused a partial collapse.
 August 24 Trinity Cathedral fire in Saint Petersburg, Russia.
 November 222006 Kolkata leather factory fire in India killed at least nine.
 December 92006 Moscow hospital fire killed 46.
 December 25Fire at a store in Ormoc City, Philippines, killed 25.

2007
 March 19Nursing home fire in Kamyshevatskaya, Krasnodar, Russia, killed 63.
 June 18Charleston Sofa Super Store Fire in Charleston, South Carolina killed nine.
 August 18Penhallow Hotel fire in Newquay, Cornwall, England, killed three and injured five.
 November 22007 Warwickshire warehouse fire in Atherstone-on-Stour, Warwickshire, England killed four.

2008
 January 7Fire at Korea 2000 refrigerated warehouse during construction in Icheon, Gyeonggi-do, South Korea, killed 40.
 February 102008 Namdaemun fire in Seoul, South Korea seriously damaged the 14th century structure.
 April 4Historic Quebec City Armoury roof and interior destroyed by fire in Quebec, Canada.
 April 25Four-story Rosamor Furniture factory fire in Lissasfa, Casablanca, Morocco, killed 55.

 May 28Historic Alma College in St. Thomas, Ontario, Canada burnt down by arsonists.
 June 12008 Universal Studios fire in Universal City, California, destroyed the master tapes of as many as a half a million songs recorded during the 20th and 21st centuries.
 June 8Texas Governor's Mansion in Austin, Texas, was heavily damaged by an arson attack during an extensive renovation.
 August 10Cornwall Court Fire in Hong Kong, killed four.
 August 10Toronto propane explosion in North York, Toronto, Canada, killed two.
 September 20Wuwang Club fire in Shenzhen, Guangdong, China, killed 43.
 October 1Video Parlour Cats fire by arsonist in Nanba, Osaka, Japan, killed 15 and injured 10.
 October 20Garrick's Villa near London, England, roof destroyed by fire.

2009
 January 1Santika Club fire, in Bangkok, Thailand, killed 66.
 January 282009 Nakumatt supermarket fire in Nairobi, Kenya, killed 29.
 February 9Beijing Television Cultural Center fire in China killed one and injured seven.
 April 13Kamień Pomorski homeless hostel fire in Poland killed 23.
 June 52009 Hermosillo daycare center fire in Mexico killed 47.
 July 32009 Lakanal House tower block fire in Camberwell, London, killed six.
 September 132009 Taldykorgan fire in Almaty Region, Kazakhstan, killed 38.
 December 4Lame Horse fire in Perm, Russia, killed 153 and injured over 140.
 December 4Medan karaoke bar fire in Medan, Indonesia, killed 20.

2010s

2010
 March 29Stephen Court historic building fire in Kolkata, India, killed at least 42.
 September 102010 San Bruno explosion in San Bruno, California, six-alarm fire from a gas main killed eight and destroyed dozens of homes.
 November 152010 Shanghai fire, high-rise apartment building fire killed at least 53.
 December 82010 Santiago prison fire. A fire in a prison in Santiago, Chile killed at least 81 inmates in the country's deadliest ever prison incident.
 December 14A fire at a factory in Dhaka, Bangladesh owned by Ha-meem Group killed 25 and injured 100.
 December 17A fire in Provo, Utah destroyed the historic Provo Tabernacle in a 4-alarm fire.
 December 19A fire at a pension house in Tuguegarao, Philippines killed 16.

2011
 November 21Fire caused by electrical short circuit at a eunuch festival, Delhi, India, killed 15 and injured at least 36.
 December 9A fire at AMRI hospital Kolkata, West Bengal mostly caused by toxic fumes spreading through ducts of the central air conditioning system, killed at least 90.

2012
 February 14Comayagua prison fire. A prison fire in Comayagua, Honduras, killed over 361 inmates.
 February 19A massive fire swept through a market in Tegucigalpa, Honduras, destroying between 500 and 1800 stalls, injured 11.
 June 26A fire in a Moscow market killed 17 migrant workers.
 May 6Explosions and a fire at Bangkok Synthetics Plant petrochemical plant for synthetic rubber, in the Map Ta Phut industrial estate in Rayong Province, Thailand, killed 12 and injured over 100.
 August 242012 Venezuela Refinery Explosion. An explosion and fire at the Paraguaná Refinery Complex killed 48 and injured 151.
 September 112012 Pakistan garment factory fires. A fire in a Karachi garment factory killed at least 312 workers.
 September 112012 Pakistan garment factory fires. A fire in a Lahore shoe factory killed 25 workers.
 October 23An arson at the Beinan Branch of Xinyang Hospital, Taiwan, killed 13 patients. The perpetrator, in the final phase of cancer and upset by his illness, received the death penalty, dying during detention in April 2014.
 November 242012 Dhaka fire. A fire in a Tazreen Fashion factory in Dhaka, Bangladesh, killed at least 124.

2013
 January 27Kiss nightclub fire. A fire in the Kiss nightclub in Santa Maria, Rio Grande do Sul, Brazil, after performers were said to have set off fireworks, killed at least 233.
 February 27A fire in Surya Sen Market, Kolkata killed 18.
 April 17West Fertilizer Company explosion. West, Texas explosion, when probable arson started a fire that detonated hundreds of tons of ammonium nitrate at a fertilizer plant, killed 15 and injured over 160.
 April 262013 Moscow psychiatric hospital fire killed 38.
 July 6Lac-Mégantic rail disaster. An unattended freight train carrying crude oil rolled into Lac-Mégantic, Quebec, Canada, and derailed, resulting in an explosion and fire which destroyed more than 30 buildings in the town's centre, killed 42 with five more missing and presumed dead.
 September 13A fire at a psychiatric hospital in Luka, Novgorod Oblast, Russia, killed 37.

2014
 May 28A fire at a hospital in Jangseong County in South Korea killed 22 and injured several more.
 September 262014 air traffic control facility fire. Arson at an air traffic control edifice in Aurora, Illinois, United States (also known as the "Chicago Center") caused close to 2000 airline flights to undertake emergency landings.
 December 292014 Lahore shopping centre fire. Fire in Anarkali Bazaar, Lahore, Pakistan, killed at least 13.

2015

 March 29Clandon Park House in Surrey, England burned. Treasures and historic items were destroyed.
 May 132015 Valenzuela fire. An industrial fire in Valenzuela, Philippines, killed 72.
 May 192015 Baku residence building fire. A fire in a residence building in Baku, Azerbaijan, killed 14.
 October 30Colectiv nightclub fire. A fire at Colectiv nightclub in Bucharest, Romania, killed 64.

2016
 January 30A massive fire at a factory in Sokolniki District, Moscow, Russia, killed 12.
 August 62016 Rouen fire. A fire at a birthday party at the Cuba Libre pub in Rouen, France, killed 14.
 August 10A hospital fire at Yarmouk Hospital in Baghdad, Iraq killed 11 newborn babies and injured 29 women. The fire was set deliberately by eight men in order to cover up their theft of 100 million Iraqi dinars. They were later arrested. The Minister of Health of Iraq later resigned due to the incident.
 September 3A fire at the Kaliti Prison during a suspected attempted jailbreak killed at least 23 during the 2016 Ethiopian protests.
 November 2A fire at a karaoke lounge in Vietnam killed 13.
 November 92016 Bethlehem Steel fire A fire at the old cooling house of a former Bethlehem Steel complex in Lackawanna, New York mobilized Erie County, New York mutual aid from the City of Buffalo as well as suburban volunteer fire companies to assist the Lackawanna Fire Department. A large plume of black smoke could be seen for miles and was picked up by the local NEXRAD weather radar. Only a minor injury to a Buffalo Firefighter occurred.
 November 26A fire almost completely destroyed the Royal Clarence Hotel in Exeter, England.
 December 22016 Oakland warehouse fire. A fire at a converted warehouse in Oakland, California killed at least 36.

2017
 June 14Grenfell Tower fire. It killed 72, including a stillborn baby.
 July 14Marco Polo condo fire. The fire in Honolulu, Hawaii, killed four and injured 13.
 September 142017 Darul Quran Ittifaqiyah madrasa fire. A fire occurred at the Tahfiz Darul Quran Ittifaqiyah School in Kuala Lumpur. At least 24 students and teachers were killed.
 December 212017 Jecheon fire. A gym fire in Jecheon, South Korea, killed 29 and injured 36.
 December 232017 Davao City mall fire, Philippines. A fire erupted in a shopping mall (NCCC Mall Davao) in Davao City, which killed 38; 37 worked for Survey Sampling International, and one of the mall's employees who was also a part of the mall's emergency response team.
 December 272017 Bronx apartment fire. A fire swept through a Bronx apartment complex killed 13 and injured 14. It was New York City's worst accidental fire in 25 years.

2018
 January 262018 Sejong Hospital fire. A hospital fire in Miryang, South Korea killed at least 37 and injured more than 131 in the country's worst fire in over a decade.
 March 22018 Baku fire. A fire killed 24 at a drug rehabilitation centre in Azerbaijan's capital Baku.
 March 23A fire in a large condominium complex in Ho Chi Minh City, Vietnam, killed 13 and injured 28.
 March 252018 Kemerovo fire. A fire killed 60 people, mostly children, at a mall in Kemerovo, Russia. Six other people were reported missing.
 March 282018 Valencia, Venezuela fire. Rioting and a fire at a police station in the Venezuelan city of Valencia, in Carabobo State, killed 68.
 April 23A suspected arson attack at a karaoke lounge in southern China killed 18 and injured five.
 August 252018 Harbin hotel fire. A fire at a hotel in Harbin, Heilongjiang, China, killed 19 and injured 23.

 September 2National Museum of Brazil fire. The National Museum of Brazil in Rio de Janeiro caught fire and lost more than 90% of its collection.

2019
 February 5A fire at a building in Paris, France, killed 10. It started by a woman after a discussion with the neighbors and was later arrested by police.
 February 8Ninho do Urubu fire. A fire in a dormitory at a soccer youth team training centre in Flamengo killed 10 teenage players.
 February 12A fire that broke out at a hotel in Delhi, India, killed 17.

 April 15Notre-Dame de Paris fire. Roof and spire were destroyed, and heavy damage was done to the interior of the cathedral due to the collapsing spire and roof, along with water and smoke damage. The cathedral was undergoing renovations. 
 July 18Kyoto Animation arson attack. A man poured gasoline and ingnited it around the studios of Kyoto Animation, killed 35.
 September 12A fire started in an electric generator behind the intensive care unit of a hospital in Rio de Janeiro, Brazil, killed 14 patients due to asphyxiation from smoke or life support equipment shutdown.
 September 18A fire in a boarding school near Monrovia, Liberia, killed 27.
 October 2Star City fire. A fire at the Star City amusement park in Pasay, Metro Manila, Philippines.
 October 22New Zealand International Convention Centre fire. A fire in the roof of an under-construction building led to disruption in Auckland's central business district for three days. The fire was left to burn itself out, four were injured.
 October 31A fire at the Shuri Castle led to the loss of seven facilities and 4800 square meters (1.19 acres) in Naha, Okinawa Prefecture, Japan.
 December 21Alpine Motel Apartments fire. A fire in Las Vegas, Nevada, killed six residents, making it the deadliest fire ever within the city limits.

2020s

2020
 18 JulyNantes Cathedral organ and windows destroyed.
 14 NovemberPiatra Neamț hospital fire in Romania, killed 10.

2021
 21 January2021 Kharkiv fire in a nursing home in Kharkiv, Ukraine, killed 15 and injured 11.
 29 JanuaryMatei Balș hospital fire in Bucharest, Romania, killed 17.
 11 March2021 Cairo clothing factory fire killed 20 and injured 24.
 26 March2021 Mumbai hospital fire killed 10.
 24 AprilBaghdad hospital fire at the Ibn al-Khatib hospital in Baghdad, Iraq, killed at least 82.
 28 AprilRiga hostel fire killed eight and injured nine.
 7 JuneJune 2021 Pune fire in India killed at least 18.
 25 JuneZhecheng school fire killed at least 18 and injured 16.
 9 JulyRupganj factory fire at a food and drink factory in Narayanganj, Bangladesh, killed 52 and injured 20.
 8 SeptemberTangerang prison fire in Indonesia killed 49 and injured 72.
 8 September2021 Tetovo hospital fire in Tetovo, North Macedonia, killed 14.
 1 OctoberConstanța hospital fire in Constanța, Romania, killed 7.
 14 October2021 Kaohsiung tower fire in southern Taiwan killed 46 and injured 41.
 17 December2021 Osaka building fire in Japan killed 26.

2022
 2 January2022 Parliament of South Africa fire damaged the Houses of Parliament, in Cape Town, South Africa.
 5 January2022 Philadelphia apartment fire killed 12.
 9 January2022 Bronx apartment fire in New York City, killed at least 17.
 4 JulyFire at the historic Police Headquarters, also known as Line Barracks or Casernes Centrales, in  Port Louis, Mauritius at two separate locations of the compounds of the Special Supporting Unit (SSU) No 4, firstly at a warehouse and then at the office premises. 
 5 AugustFire at Mountain B night-club in Pattaya, Thailand, killed 14 people and injured 40.
 14 AugustGiza church fire in Giza, Egypt, killed at least 41 people.
 6 September2022 Binh Duong karaoke bar fire in Vietnam killed 33 people.
 17 NovemberA fire at a residential building in the Gaza Strip killed 21 people.
 24 November2022 Ürümqi fire in China killed 10 and injured nine.
 16 DecemberVaulx-en-Velin fire in France killed 10 and injured 14.
 24 December2022 Kemerovo nursing home fire in Russia killed 22 and injured six.

2023
2 JanuaryNew County Hotel fire in Scotland killed three and injured 11.
19 JanuaryA fire at a military barracks in Azat, Armenia, killed 15 and injured seven.
6 FebruaryA fire in a house in Charly-sur-Marne, France, killed 8 and injured 1.
3 MarchPlumpang oil depot fire in Indonesia killed 17 when an oil depot caught on fire and exploded, with the fire spreading to nearby dense residential areas.

See also
 List of fires
 List of town and city fires
 List of fires at major places of worship

References

building